The Best... So Far is a greatest hits album by Canadian country artist Anne Murray. It was released by Capitol Records on November 29, 1994. The album peaked at number 2 on the RPM Country Albums chart.

This disc was certified Platinum by the RIAA for United States sales of over a million copies.

Track listing

Chart performance

Year-end charts

References

1994 compilation albums
Anne Murray compilation albums